Lower class may refer to:
Lower social class, those at or near the bottom of the socio-economic hierarchy; also known as the underclass, and may include many of those at the bottom of the working class
American lower class, more specifically, the lower class in the United States
Lower middle class, a sub-division of the middle class, just above the lower class
Working class, those employed in blue collar, pink collar, and manual jobs; may encompass the lower class and the lower middle class
Proletariat, the class of wage-earners in a capitalist society whose main material value is their labour-power; encompasses the working class and the underclass

See also
Social class, social stratification of people into a set of hierarchical social categories
Commoner, people in a feudal system who are members of neither the nobility nor the priesthood
Underclass, those at lowest possible position in a class hierarchy, below the working class; also called the lower-lower-class